Goniotorna irresoluta is a species of moth of the family Tortricidae. It is found in Madagascar.

Subspecies
Goniotorna irresoluta irresoluta (eastern Madagascar)
Goniotorna irresoluta taeniata Diakonoff, 1960 (north-eastern Madagascar)

References

	

Moths described in 1960
Goniotorna